Manakula Vinayagar Temple is a Hindu temple in the Union Territory of Puducherry, India. Dedicated to the god Ganesa, it is a popular pilgrimage site and tourist destination in Puducherry. The temple is of considerable antiquity and predates French occupation of the territory. During the tenure of Dupleix, there were attempts to destroy the temple, but it was spared owing to strong protests from the Hindu population and the threat of British and Maratha invasion of the territory.

Location
The Manakula Vinayagar Temple is one of the ancient temples in Puducherry, a Union Territory situated in the southern part of the Indian sub-continent. The temple is 400 meters West of the Bay of Bengal, 165 km South of Chennai (Capital of Tamil Nadu State), 23 km of North of Cuddalore and 35 km East of Viluppuram, Tamil Nadu. The main deity of this temple, "Manakula Vinayagar" (Pranavamurthy), is facing east. The temple was once bordered on the east side by Orlean Street (Now Manakula Vinayagar Koil Street), south by Jawaharlal Nehru Street, north by Law-de-Louristhon street and west by a canal running north–south.

Temple was renovated in 2015.

It is highly frequented by tourists, being just 10 minutes walk from the famous beach road facing the Promenade Beach of Pondicherry.

Specialty 
The Manakula Vinayagar Temple, in Puducherry, is a grand and beautiful temple, dedicated to the Hindu lord Ganesha. Puducherry might be a place full of churches but Manakula Vinayagar Temple is highly coveted among Hindu devotees and tourists, traveling from all parts of the country. Being more than 500 years old, it has an illustrious history and is one of the oldest temples in the region.  

The temple derives its name from two Tamil words Manal meaning 'sand' and Kulam meaning 'pond near the sea'. The temple was known by the name Manal Kulathu Vinayagar earlier. A number of festivals and celebrations are conducted at the temple all throughout the year, yet Brahmothsavam, a 24-day long festival, is the most important one.

While we have not heard of a night shrine for Vinayaka in any temple, there is one in the Manakula Vinayagar temple. He stays here with his consorts. The idol taken to this shrine, called Palliarai, will have the feet part alone. Vinayaka on the Well: The stage (peetam) set for the God is in a well which many may not know. This may be a well or even a tank. A six-inch radius pit runs on the left side of the peetam, the depth of which could not be measured and it is always full.

Golden Chariot
The golden chariot was made purely on the basis of collection of donations from the devotees. The total weight of the gold used in this chariot is 7.5 kg with the estimate of around Rs.35 lakhs. The height & breadth of the chariot is 10 ft & 6 ft. The chariot was fully made up in teakwood covered by copper plates duly engraved with beautiful art works and the plates duly attached with golden rakes. At first the running of the said Golden Chariot was held on 05-10-2003 in a grand manner. At present most of the devotees are very much interested to fulfill their prayer by pulling the Golden chariot inside the temple on payment of fixed fees. Once in year i.e. on Vijayadhasami day the said Golden Chariot run outside of the temple i.e. only in the maada veedhis.

Thollaikkathu Siddar 

Nearly 300 years before a saint (referred as Siddar in Tamil language) standing 6ft tall said to have got enlightenment from this deity and attained Samadhi in this temple. From then on people bring their new born here for worship before going to any other temple.

Scholar works about the temple 
 Mahan Vanna Sarabam Dhandapani Swamigal has sung Sthothira Parthigam on Lord Manakula Vinayaga Peruman.
 Sri V. M. Subramania Iyer has written "Puduvai Manakula Vinayagar Suprapatham."
 Also some 100 years back Puduvai Mahavidvan Sri P. A. Ponnuswamy has written "Manakula Vinayagar Nanmani Malai" for which Tamil teacher Sri Ellapillai has written a support poem "Vedapuriyil Vilangum Mankulthu Nathan".
 Puduvai Nellithope Sri G. Ramanuja Chettiar has written and released in "Sri Manakula Vinayagar Parthigam".
 Subramania Bharathi has sung about Manakula Vinayagar in "Vinayaga Naanmani Maalai"

Gallery

Notes

External links 

 
  Manakula Vinayagar Temple Info 

Hindu temples in Puducherry
Ganesha temples
Buildings and structures in Pondicherry (city)

Temple by the Beach